Thrikkunnathu Seminary , Aluva, was founded in 1880 by the Metropolitan H.G Ambatt Geevarghese Mar Coorilose of the Malankara Church .

Thrikkunnathu Seminary is the headquarters of the Angamaly Diocese of the Malankara Orthodox Syrian Church . The Seminary was closed for 40 years due to the disputes between the Patriarch and the Metropolitan factions of the Malankara Orthodox church .

Early Church
In 1880 the Malankara Syrian Church acquired  of land for construction of the church and a cornerstone was laid in 1889. The church began as a small building thatched with coconut leaves in the early 1900s. Paulose Mar Athanasius built the current St Mary's Church in the early 1930s.  The western side of the building was extended in 1964. 
Patriarchs of Antioch, Ignatius Abded Aloho II, St.Ignatius Elias III and Ignatius Jacob III had visited this church in 1911, 1931 and 1964.

Tombs
 H.G Kadavil Paulose Mar Athanasios  (1907)
 H.G Kuttikkattil Paulose Mar Athanasios  (1953)
 H.G Vayalipparambil Geevarghese Mar Gregorios (1966)

 
 H.G Kallupurackal Dr. Philipose Mar Theophilos (1997)

References

Churches completed in 1932
Malankara Orthodox Syrian church buildings
Religious organizations established in 1880
Aluva
Churches in Ernakulam district
20th-century churches in India
20th-century Oriental Orthodox church buildings